Pseudoamuria neglecta is a species of moth in the family Zygaenidae. It is found in Queensland, Australia.

The length of the forewings is 7 mm for females. The wings are elongate. The upperside of the forewings is dark brownish grey, with a small divided yellow spot on the distal part of the cell. The underside is greyish yellow proximally, but darker and brownish distally. The hindwings are opaque and densely scaled. The upperside is grey brown, with two indistinct, yellow streaks in the basal half of the wing and a small spot across the distal end of the cell. The underside is similar but slightly paler, with an additional yellow streak along the costa.

References

Moths described in 2005
Procridinae